Vaughan Metropolitan Centre (also known as Vaughan, Vaughan Metro Centre or VMC) is a rapid transit station in Vaughan, Ontario, Canada. Opened on December 17, 2017, it is the north terminus of the western section of the Toronto subway's Line 1 Yonge–University. It is operated by the Toronto Transit Commission (TTC) and is one of two subway stations in the system outside of Toronto's city limits. It provides connections to Viva Rapid Transit's Highway 7 Rapidway, which is also used by Brampton Transit's Züm buses, as well as local bus routes of York Region Transit (YRT).

Located in Vaughan Metropolitan Centre, the suburban city's future central business district, the station is designated by Metrolinx as a mobility hub, one of several multimodal transit terminals in the Greater Toronto and Hamilton Area. The station has a 900-space park-and-ride lot, which is privately owned and operated by SmartCentres, unlike other TTC rapid transit station parking lots which are owned and operated by the TTC itself.

Description

The subway station is located on the northwest corner of Millway Avenue and Highway 7, west of Jane Street, and is one of two new stations that are outside the City of Toronto in York Region. This is the northernmost station in the subway system.

Grimshaw Architects designed the station, which has a domed ovoid entrance building just north of the Rapidway platforms on Highway 7. The building has four main entrances in an X pattern, plus an underground connection to two office buildings, one of which contains the David Braley Vaughan Metropolitan Centre of Community, which houses a YMCA and the VMC branch of the Vaughan Public Library. The main entrance features a cool roof, and a nearby electrical substation located on the south side of Highway 7 has a green roof. Toronto-based Paul Raff Studio provided the station's artwork, titled Atmospheric Lense, consisting of coloured mirrored panels and windows located on the domed ceiling, and visible by looking up stairwells.

Underground corridors lead both north and south from the station's concourse level to two YRT bus terminals. The north corridor leads to the SmartVMC Bus Terminal, where passengers can transfer to conventional YRT bus routes, and the south corridor leads to the Vaughan Metropolitan Centre Vivastation on the Highway 7 Rapidway, where riders connect to Viva and Züm bus rapid transit routes. The fare-paid area features a Gateway Newstands kiosk.

History
On November 27, 2009, the official groundbreaking ceremony was held for the Toronto-York Spadina Subway Extension (TYSSE), and tunnelling began in June 2011. The project was expected to be completed by the fourth quarter of 2016, but the timeline was revised, with the station planned to open by the end of 2017. Ultimately, the station opened on December 17, 2017, with this station replacing  as the northwestern terminus of Line 1.

While VMC, along with the five other TYSSE stations, had a fare booth installed as per original station plans, it never housed collectors, as the station was among the first eight (along with the first two south of the extension) to discontinue sales of legacy TTC fare media such as tokens and tickets. Presto vending machines were available at its opening to sell Presto cards and to load funds or monthly passes onto them. On May 3, 2019, this station became one of the first ten stations to sell Presto tickets via Presto vending machines.

Station name
During the initial planning stages of the TYSSE, the City of Vaughan wanted the station named "Vaughan Corporate Centre", after the name of its proposed new downtown, and later requested "Vaughan Metropolitan Centre" after it changed the name of the development. On September 30, 2010, a TTC committee recommended that the name be changed to "Vaughan Centre", despite the City's desire for the full name. However, the TTC delayed a final decision on the committee's report until February 2012, when Vaughan's preference for the full name was adopted. The TTC originally rejected the name to avoid linking the station to a specific development. The length of the name was seen as an inconvenience and "Vaughan Centre" was more consistent with other regional centre station names (i.e.  and ). A survey was conducted between September 23 and October 21, 2011, by the TTC to determine the preferred name. 80% supported "Vaughan Centre", 5% supported "Vaughan Corporate Centre", 9% supported "Vaughan Metropolitan Centre" and 7% supported other names. Other discussed names were "Highway 7", "Highway 7 West", "Jane North", "Edgeley", "Creditstone", and "Applewood". The new Toronto Rocket subway trains' exterior front and rear destination signs display simply "Vaughan" and, on trains with side exterior destination signs, "Line 1 towards Vaughan", rather than the  full station name.

Subway infrastructure in the vicinity 

As this is a terminal station, there is a diamond crossover to the south of the platform for arriving trains to cross over to the southbound track, and for departing trains on the northbound track to cross to the southbound track. There are also tail tracks beyond the north end for overnight storage for two trains, with a trackless extra tunnel between them for a future potential third.

Fare zone
To avoid implementing a payment-on-exit system, the station is part of the Toronto TTC fare zone despite being located in York Region. This is in contrast to TTC-contracted bus routes, where riders are required to pay extra fare (for YRT) when travelling beyond the municipal boundary at Steeles Avenue. This is analogous to the situation in 1968, when the TTC had an internal fare zone system and "Zone 2" fares were charged when crossing the zones on buses or streetcars, yet no extra fare was required to reach five new subway stations which opened outside the pre-amalgamation Toronto city limits in Zone 2 that year, although the Zone 2 fare was charged when transferring to connecting bus routes in the suburban municipalities of Metropolitan Toronto. Similarly, at this (as well as at the adjacent Highway 407) station, separate fares are charged when transferring between the TTC subway and connecting YRT or Züm buses, which are the only surface routes serving it.

Surface connections

No TTC buses connect to this station, but the aforementioned two bus terminals serve regional buses:

SmartVMC Bus Terminal

SmartVMC Bus Terminal (previously known as SmartCentres Place Bus Terminal) is a YRT bus terminal north of the station to the west side of Millway Avenue, outside the station's fare-paid area. Diamond Schmitt Architects designed the terminal in a horseshoe shape. The building features open architecture that can be accessed from every direction. There is a passenger kiss-and-ride area on Millway Avenue and an underground walkway linking it with the subway station and Viva rapidway station on Highway 7.

The total cost of the terminal was approximately $32million. The terminal was named after its developer, SmartCentres REIT, who contributed $15million in financing for an underground connection between the bus terminal and the station.

The terminal was opened on November 3, 2019, nearly two years after the station. It was expected to open in early 2018, shortly after the station itself, but it was delayed due to unspecified "unforeseen circumstances". Prior to the opening of the terminal, buses used the current kiss-and-ride area.

The following YRT routes serve the terminal:

Since August 31, 2020, it is also served by a Brampton Transit bus rapid transit route, the 501 Züm Queen (which also serves the Vivastation on Highway 7):

The following YRT routes use an on-street stop at the station's main entrance on Highway 7 and do not stop inside the terminal or Vivastation:

Vivastation

The Vaughan Metropolitan Centre Vivastation is a covered transfer facility in the centre of the Highway 7 Rapidway. It allows Viva Orange buses and Brampton Transit–operated 501 Züm Queen through-service buses to quickly serve the subway station without having to pull into the SmartVMC terminal, although the 501's main branch does terminate there while also serving the Vivastation. The facility is located directly above the station's concourse and connects to it via escalators and elevators. It is located south of the main station building and bus terminal, both of which can be accessed from the Vivastation either underground through the concourse or at ground level via a crosswalk and sidewalks.

City centre development

Vaughan plans to build a transit-oriented city centre from scratch around the station in what is a low-density area featuring big-box stores and vacant land. Vaughan projects that by 2031, the new downtown will have 25,000 residents and employment for more than 11,000 people. Vaughan planning commissioner John MacKenzie said that Mississauga took 20 to 25 years to build its city centre without a subway, but hopes to accelerate the process in Vaughan with the help of the subway extension.

References

External links

Map indicating alignment of extension and location of stations
Updated TTC Subway Map

Line 1 Yonge–University stations
Railway stations in Vaughan
Railway stations in Canada opened in 2017
York Region Transit Terminals
Brampton Transit
2017 establishments in Ontario
Viva Rapid Transit